Veselin Ivanov Beshevliev (25 March 1900 – ) was a Bulgarian historian and philologist. He was a correspondent member of the Bulgarian Academy of Sciences from 1941 to his death. He was the author of Old Bulgarian Inscriptions.

Career
He studied history and Slavic philology in the Sofia University (1919-1920) and classical philology in Germany - Halle, Jena and Würzburg (1920-1925) where he took doctorate. He became teaching assistant (1925-1929), docent (1929-1933) and professor in Classical philology in the Sofia University. He was awarded the Herder Prize in 1972.

Publications 
 1979, Old Bulgarian Inscriptions, first edition; 1992, second edition
 1981, Proto-Bulgarian Epigraphic Monuments

References

Bibliography 

 

20th-century Bulgarian historians
Bulgarian medievalists
Bulgarian philologists
Corresponding Members of the Bulgarian Academy of Sciences
1900 births
1992 deaths
Herder Prize recipients
Academic staff of Sofia University
20th-century philologists